Sport Clube Mineiro Aljustrelense is a Portuguese football club that competes in the Campeonato de Portugal. They were founded in 1933.



Current squad

External links
 Official site 

Football clubs in Portugal
Association football clubs established in 1933
1933 establishments in Portugal